Paul Goodwin (born 2 September 1956) is an English conductor and former oboist.

Oboist
Goodwin was born in Warwick, England.  He studied oboe with Janet Craxton, and following his graduation from the University of Nottingham with a degree in composition, he specialized in contemporary oboe techniques and the baroque oboe at the Guildhall School of Music and Drama in London. He continued his studies in Vienna with Jurg Schäftlein.

Goodwin was recognized as one of the worlds foremost early oboe specialists, playing all periods of music on historical oboes, and was principal oboist of The English Concert and the London Classical Players. He has made more than 20 solo and concerto records.

Conductor
In 1996 he made the decision to give up his oboe career and dedicate himself solely to conducting. He subsequently studied conducting in Helsinki with Jorma Panula, and took up posts with The Academy of Ancient Music (associate conductor), and the English Chamber Orchestra (principal guest conductor). Goodwin has become one of Britain's most versatile conductors, renowned for his historically informed interpretations of baroque, classical and romantic music, while also being a great advocate of contemporary music.

He has been Artistic Director and Principal Conductor of the Carmel Bach Festival in California (2010–2021), Principal Guest Conductor of Capella Aquileia in Germany and Director of the Historical Performance Programme at the Escuela Superior de Musica Reina Sofia, in Madrid.

For 11 years Goodwin was the Associate Conductor of the Academy of Ancient Music, touring extensively and making recordings of Heinrich Schütz' choral music, Mozart's singspiel Zaide and two discs of music by Sir John Tavener that Goodwin commissioned for the AAM. Three of these CDs have been nominated for Grammy (US) and Gramophone Awards (UK). Subsequent AAM commissions were pieces by David Bedford, John Woolrich and, Thea Musgrave.

Goodwin was one of the principal guest conductors with the Kammerorchester Basel, with whom he performed both on modern and period instruments in a wide range of repertoire from J. S. Bach to Mark Anthony Turnage. Goodwin was the Principal Guest Conductor of the English Chamber Orchestra for six years, collaborating with such artists as Kiri Te Kanawa, Joshua Bell, Maria João Pires, Mstislav Rostropovich and Magdalena Kožená. Goodwin has also recorded CDs of Amy Beach and a highly acclaimed CD of Elgar's Nursery Suite for Harmonia Mundi, France.

Goodwin has a wide symphonic repertoire, conducting orchestras including the BBC Philharmonic, the Hallé Orchestra, the City of Birmingham Symphony Orchestra the BBC National Orchestra of Wales and Scottish Chamber Orchestra. In the US he has conducted the Minnesota Orchestra, the National Symphony Orchestra (NSO) Washington, D.C., the Philadelphia Orchestra, the San Francisco Symphony and in Europe, the Belgian National Orchestra, Spanish National, Polish National, Taiwan National, Royal Stockholm Philharmonic and the Münchner Rundfunkorchester, NDR Bayerischer Rundfunk and Leipzig Gewandhaus Orchestra. His repertoire spans from Purcell and Bach to Brahms and Schumann, from Ravel, Elgar and Stravinsky, to Messiaen, Takemitsu and Maxwell Davies.

Goodwin's successes have included Mozart's Cosi fan tutte at the Royal Danish Opera, Gluck's Iphigenie en Tauride at the Komische Oper Berlin, Britten's The Rape of Lucretia at the Teatro Real Madrid and Handel's Orlando at Opera Australia. Past highlights include Mozart's Nozze di Figaro and Il Re Pastore at Opera North, Idomeneo at the Graz Opera, The Magic Flute at the Aalto Theatre in Essen, Monteverdi's L'incoronazione di Poppea in Athens, Handel's Orlando at the Flanders Opera and Haydn's Orfeo ed Euridice in Madrid. Goodwin is also known for his collaboration with Jonathan Miller on a ground-breaking staging of Bach's St. Matthew Passion.

On educational projects, Goodwin has worked with the National Youth Orchestra of the Netherlands the Spanish National Youth Orchestra, the Orchestra Giovanile Italiana, the Junge Deutsche Philharmonie, the New World Symphony in the USA, and with the orchestras of the Royal College of Music and Royal Academy of Music, and the Royal Conservatory of The Hague. Goodwin was for nine years conductor of the Queen Elisabeth Competition Brussels. He has recorded Prokofiev's Peter and the Wolf and Chappell's Paddington Bear with the Munich Radio Symphony Orchestra. 

Goodwin was awarded the Handel Prize of the City of Halle (Saale) in 2007 in recognition of his extraordinary services to performances of works by George Frederic Handel.

Discography
As a conductor, Goodwin has recorded CDs of Handel's operas Lotario and Riccardo Primo, his oratorio Athalia, discs of Schutz, Britten, Elgar, Tavener, Richard Strauss, Mozart, J. S. Bach, Kozeluch and Amadeus Hartmann.

References

English conductors (music)
British male conductors (music)
English classical oboists
Male oboists
Alumni of the University of Nottingham
Living people
Academics of the Royal College of Music
British performers of early music
Place of birth missing (living people)
1956 births
Handel Prize winners
21st-century British conductors (music)
21st-century British male musicians